"U Ain't Goin' Nowhere" was the third single from Young Buck's second album, Buck the World. It features contemporary R&B singer LaToiya Williams and was produced by Dr. Dre and Mark Batson.

Music video
In the music video, the song is cut off about halfway through the video and goes to his other song, "Buck the World", which features Lyfe Jennings.. The video was directed by Gil Green (director). The music video was unique as it was filmed in Havana Cuba. The filming in Cuba was made possible after Interscope Records and Gil Green received special authorization from The U.S. Department of the Treasury’s Office of Foreign Assets Control (OFAC).

Charts

Personnel
Young Buck: vocals
LaToiya Williams: vocals
Mark Batson: keyboard
Dawaun Parker: keyboard
Mike Elizondo: guitar
Mixed and produced by Dr. Dre

References

External links 
 

2007 singles
Young Buck songs
Song recordings produced by Dr. Dre
Song recordings produced by Mark Batson
G-Unit Records singles
Interscope Records singles
2007 songs
Songs written by Young Buck
Songs written by Mike City
Songs written by Dr. Dre